The historiography of the Ottoman Empire refers to the studies, sources, critical methods and interpretations used by scholars to develop a history of the Ottoman Dynasty's empire.

Scholars have long studied the Empire, looking at the causes for its formation (such as the Ghaza thesis), its relations to the Great Powers (such as Sick man of Europe) and other empires (such as Transformation of the Ottoman Empire), and the kinds of people who became imperialists or anti-imperialists (such as the Young Turks), together with their mindsets. The history of the breakdown of the Empire (such as Ottoman decline thesis) has attracted scholars of the histories of the Middle East (such as Partition of the Ottoman Empire), and Greece (Rise of nationalism in the Ottoman Empire).

New Themes 

Western understanding of the Ottoman History. Ottoman history has been rewritten for political and cultural advantage and speculative theories rife with inconsistent research, ahistorical assumptions and embedded biases. Partly because the archives are moderately new. The Ottoman Archives are a collection of historical sources related to the Ottoman Empire and a total of 39 nations whose territories one time or the other were part of this Empire, including 19 nations in the Middle East, 11 in the EU and Balkans, three in the Caucasus, two in Central Asia, Cyprus, as well as Palestine and the Republic of Turkey. Ottoman Bank Archives and Research Centre operated in the former Head Office of the Ottoman Bank

Regarding the Ottoman Industrial Revolution, Edward Clark said, Ottoman responses to this European economic challenge are relatively unknown, and even the extensive and costly Ottoman industrial efforts of the 1840s seemingly have been dismissed as the casual, if not comical games of disinterested bureaucrats... What were the nature and magnitude of these Ottoman responses? What were Ottoman objectives? What main factors contributed to their failures? What if any achievements resulted?

Establishment of the Empire 

Osman's Dream is a mythological story relating to the life of Osman I, founder of the Ottoman Empire. The story describes a dream experienced by Osman while staying in the home of a religious figure, Sheikh Edebali, in which he sees a metaphorical vision predicting the growth and prosperity of an empire to be ruled by him and his descendants. However there are other thesis addresses the question of how the Ottomans were able to expand from a small principality on the frontier of the Byzantine Empire into a centralized, intercontinental empire. According to the Ghaza thesis, the Ottomans accomplished this by attracting recruits to fight for them in the name of Islamic holy war against the non-believers. Such a warrior was known in Turkish as a ghazi, and thus this thesis sees the early Ottoman state as a "Ghazi State," defined by an ideology of holy war. The Ghaza Thesis dominated early Ottoman historiography throughout much of the twentieth century before coming under increasing criticism beginning in the 1980s. Historians now generally reject the Ghaza Thesis, and consequently the idea that Ottoman expansion was primarily fueled by holy war, but are conflicted with regard to what to replace it with.

Effect of nationalism 

In seeking new identities and ideological foundations for their states, Arabs and Turks invoked ancient history: the Pharaohs, Kings of Babylon, and the Hittites of pre-Ottoman Anatolia. This could involve hostility and often vilification, not so much regarding specific Ottoman policies but more about state building processes. Doumani’s study of the Arab region of Ottoman Palestine notes: "most Arab nationalists view the entire Ottoman era as a period of oppressive Turkish rule which stifled Arab culture and socioeconomic development and paved the way for European colonial control and the Zionist takeover of Palestine." The 19th- and early 20th-century literature written by Westerners bent on "discovering" the Holy Land—that is, reclaiming it from what they believed was a stagnant and declining Ottoman Empire—provided the intellectual foundation for this shared image.

Collapse of the Empire 

Many twentieth-century scholars argued that power of the Ottoman Empire began waning after the death of Suleiman the Magnificent in 1566, and without the acquisition of significant new wealth the empire went into decline, a concept known as the Ottoman Decline Thesis. Since the late 1970s, however, historians increasingly came to question the idea of Ottoman decline, and now there is a consensus among academic historians that the Ottoman Empire did not decline.

See also

History of Turkey
Abolition of the Ottoman Sultanate

Bibliography

Book

Journal articles
 - Multiple book reviews

References

 
Dissolution of the Ottoman Empire
Ottoman Empire

sl:Propad Otomanskega cesarstva
fi:Osmanien valtakunnan rappeutuminen ja mureneminen